Robin Sharma is a Canadian writer, best known for his The Monk Who Sold His Ferrari book series. Sharma worked as a litigation lawyer until age 25, when he self-published MegaLiving (1994), a book on stress management and spirituality. He initially also self-published The Monk Who Sold His Ferrari, which was then picked up for wider distribution by HarperCollins. Sharma has published 12 other books, and founded the training company Sharma Leadership International.

Early life and career 
Sharma is of Indian origin. He has a Master's degree in law. Initially, he worked as a lawyer, but he says he couldn't find satisfaction or peace in it. Sharma started his writing career at the age of 25. He became widely known for his second book, The Monk Who Sold His Ferrari. After his second book went successful, he quit his career as a lawyer and became a full-time writer. Later, he also started public speaking and became popular as a speaker as well. He is consulted by many CEOs and other leaders from the corporate world to get advice on how to keep their employees motivated. He has also conducted trainings for many companies, like Nike, Microsoft, IBM, and FedEx. Many organisations such as Yale University, Harvard Business School, and NASA also call him to give public speeches.

Selected publications
 Megaliving!: 30 Days to a Perfect Life (1994)
 The Monk Who Sold His Ferrari (1997)
 Leadership Wisdom from the Monk Who Sold His Ferrari (1998)
 Who Will Cry When You Die: Life Lessons from the Monk Who Sold His Ferrari (1999)
 Family Wisdom from the Monk Who Sold His Ferrari (2001)
 The Saint, the Surfer, and the CEO (2002)
 The Greatness Guide: 101 Lessons for Making What's Good at Work and in Life Even Better (2006)
 The Greatness Guide Book 2: 101 More Insights to Get You to World Class (2008)
 The Leader Who Had No Title (2010)
 The Secret Letters of the Monk Who Sold His Ferrari (2011)
 Little Black Book for Stunning Success (2016)
 The 5 AM Club (2018)
 The Everyday Hero Manifesto (2021)

References

External links
Official website

1965 births
Canadian self-help writers
Living people
Business speakers